Paolo Caylina the Younger was a 16th-century Italian painter active mainly in Brescia in a Renaissance style.

Biography
He was the nephew of both Vincenzo Foppa and Paolo Caylina the Elder, and son of Bartolomeo Caylina. He is sometimes erroneously referred to a Paolo Foppa or Paolo Zoppo. Paolo Caylina the Elder was a son of a painter name Pietro, working in alongside Foppa in 1458 at Pavia, and during 1459–1575 in Brescia. Some sources say Paolo Zoppo painted a bowl with the Sack of Brescia which took place in 1512, planned as a gift for Doge Andrea Gritti, but that the bowl was broken and that this caused him to die of grief at Desenzano at Garda.

He frescoed a scene of the Life of St John the Baptist, including the Banquet of Herod, in 1578 a chapel for the Church of San Giovanni Battista at Edolo.

Gallery

References

Year of birth unknown
Year of death unknown
16th-century Italian painters
Italian male painters
Painters from Brescia
Italian Renaissance painters